Robert Gifford, 1st Baron Gifford, PC (24 February 1779 – 4 September 1826), was a British lawyer, judge and politician.

Gifford was born in Exeter, and entered the Middle Temple in 1800. He was called to the bar in 1808, and joined the Western Circuit.

Gifford was elected to the House of Commons for Eye in 1817, a seat he represented until 1824, and served under the Earl of Liverpool as Solicitor General between 1817 and 1819 and as Attorney General between 1819 and 1824. The latter year he was raised to the peerage as Baron Gifford, of St Leonard's in the County of Devon, and appointed Lord Chief Justice of the Common Pleas. Lord Gifford only held this post for a short time and was then Master of the Rolls from 1824 until his early death in September 1826, aged 47. He was succeeded in the barony by his son Robert.

Coat of arms

References

Kidd, Charles, Williamson, David (editors). Debrett's Peerage and Baronetage (1990 edition). New York: St Martin's Press, 1990.

External links 
 

1779 births
1826 deaths
Barons in the Peerage of the United Kingdom
Chief Justices of the Common Pleas
Members of the Parliament of the United Kingdom for English constituencies
UK MPs 1812–1818
UK MPs 1818–1820
UK MPs 1820–1826
UK MPs who were granted peerages
Masters of the Rolls
Members of the Privy Council of the United Kingdom
Peers of the United Kingdom created by George IV